The 1911 College Basketball All-Southern Team consisted of basketball players from the South chosen at their respective positions.

All-Southerns

Guards
Roy Cook, Mercer (CCS)
Louis Seelbach, Central (CCS)

Forwards
Zeke Martin, Vanderbilt (CCS)
Tillou Forbes, Georgia (CCS)

Center
Will Seelbach, Central (CCS)

Key
CCS = selected by C. C. Stroud, Mercer coach. Major of Auburn was placed as an alternate center.

References

All-Southern